Xinpu is a railway station on the Taiwan Railways Administration West Coast line (Coastal line) located in Tongxiao Township, Miaoli County, Taiwan.

History
The station was opened on 11 October 1922.

See also
 List of railway stations in Taiwan

References

External links

1922 establishments in Taiwan
Railway stations in Miaoli County
Railway stations opened in 1922
Railway stations served by Taiwan Railways Administration